Federación de Comunidades Budistas de España ("Federation of Buddhist Communities of Spain", abbreviation UBE-FEBE) is a Spanish organisation that functions as an umbrella organisation to the country's Buddhist communities.

Buddhism started becoming more visible in the Spanish society after 1978 when the country's new constitution was adopted and thus freedom of religion was guaranteed. The federation was officially founded in 1992.

As of September 2021 the federation has 22 member organisations.

The federation is a member of the European Buddhist Union.

References 

Buddhism in Spain
Organizations established in 1991
Organisations based in Spain